Yanna Cholaeva (born August 8, 1985) is a Russian female acrobatic gymnast. Along with Anna Melnikova, she has come second in the Women's Pair event at the world championships in both 2004 and 2006.

References

External links
 

1985 births
Living people
Russian acrobatic gymnasts
Female acrobatic gymnasts
Medalists at the Acrobatic Gymnastics World Championships
21st-century Russian women